Allahabad-e Olya or Allahabad-e Bala, both meaning "Upper Allahabad",  may refer to:
 Allahabad-e Olya, Kerman
 Allahabad-e Olya, North Khorasan
 Allahabad-e Bala, Sistan and Baluchestan Province